The Christmas Heart is a 2012 Hallmark Channel Christmas film directed by Gary Yates. The movie first released on the Hallmark Channel on December 2, 2012 and stars Teri Polo, Paul Essiembre, and Ty Wood. The film's premise follows a group of neighbors that come together to help provide emotional support for a teenage boy that needs a heart transplant.

Plot
The neighbors along Arthur Avenue in Cleveland have a forty-year tradition of lining their quaint street with Christmas luminaria.  However, one year the tradition is placed on hold out of respect for the Normans (Ann and Mike), whose son Matt is seriously ill and in need of a heart transplant.  The situation causes their younger son, Tommy, to emotionally withdraw.

In Detroit, a man expecting his first child suddenly dies.  His heart is found to be a match for Matt; however, a lack of transportation threatens to keep it from getting to Cleveland.  Finally, a small plane is found (a two-seater which must now carry three people: the pilot, a nurse carrying the heart, and a surgeon dressed as Santa), but is unable to land due to a blizzard arriving in Cleveland.  Meanwhile, the donor's girlfriend goes into labor back in Detroit.

Tommy refuses to believe that Matt is going to die, and decides he's going to light the luminaria (with the help of Bob, a neighbor known along the street as somewhat pessimistic).  Between them all the luminaria are lit, which provides a surprise – the small plane sees the lit street and manages to land the plane on it (at that same time the donor's girlfriend gives birth), eventually getting the heart to the Cleveland Clinic and transplanted into Matt.

Cast
 Teri Polo as Ann Norman
Paul Essiembre	as Mike Norman
 Ty Wood as Matt Norman
Cruise Brown as Tommy Norman
Tess Harper as Elizabeth
John B. Lowe as Don Foy
Susan Kelso as Yvonne
Samantha Kendrick as Karen
Blake Taylor as Bob
Cherissa Richards as Dr. Shirazi
Adam Hurtig as Jimmy Mars
Arden Alfonso as Nicky
Stephen Eric McIntyre as John
Mike Bell as Ray
Jess Mal Gibbons as Miller (as Jess Gibbons)
Paul Magel as Dr. Brady
Aisha Alfa as Nurse Detroit
Adriana O'Neil as Nurse Cleveland

Production
Heaton first began working on a treatment for The Christmas Heart around 2000 and pitched it to a Hollywood executive, but a film deal was never confirmed. His sister Patricia Heaton remembered the script Heaton had written and sent a copy of his treatment to Hallmark, who purchased the treatment and the script. Filming for The Christmas Heart took place in Winnipeg, Manitoba during March 2012. Due to the unseasonably warm weather in Winnipeg, the film crew had to make snow to make it look "like winter", but was also able to find "a snow bank in the parking lot of a church".

Reception
Critical reception was mixed to positive, and the Christian Film Database stated that they found the film "very touching". A reviewer for The Philadelphia Inquirer remarked that the film "[followed the] made-for-TV Christmas formula" and that it "would work better if we were a little more invested in young Matt and his survival", but that the ending was satisfying. The Akron Beacon Journal also commented that the film held "no surprises" but that "If you are willing to surrender to its unabashed sentimentality, you may find reason for a sniffle or two, and maybe a reason to smile at the end".

See also 
 List of Christmas films

References

External links
 
 

2012 television films
2012 films
American Christmas films